Mariel Viray Pamintuan (born February 24, 1998), better known as simply Mariel Pamintuan, is a Filipino actress. She was a former Star Magic Artist and is currently a talent of GMA Network and GMA Artist Center.

Career
Mariel Pamintuan started doing workshop at a very young age.  She got her first acting stint on GMA Network's Kamandag as the young counterpart of Maxene Magalona's character Lily. She's also been in several commercials and print ads like Coca-Cola, Chuckie, Lemon Square Mamon, Jollibee, Pure n Fresh Cologne, Del Monte Fruit Cocktail, and AyosDito.ph. Being a former Star Magic Artist, Mariel was known for her character in Angelito: Batang Ama as Charee Pineda's sister Rachel Dimaano. When she transferred to GMA Network in 2013 she was given the chance to play the role of Mila Aguirre, Heart Evangelista's sister, in Magkano Ba ang Pag-ibig?. In 2014, she became one of the cast of My BFF alongside Ms. Manilyn Reynes and Mr. Janno Gibbs. She then welcomed 2015 with a drama series entitled Once Upon a Kiss of which she played the role of Miguel Tanfelix' older sister Athena Pelaez Almario who at first hated Ella played by Bianca Umali. After Once Upon a Kiss she is set to do another drama series with Ms. Heart Evangelista whom she worked with in her first Kapuso drama series. She had her first ever lead role in an episode of Maalaala Mo Kaya entitled Pinto with Ms. Sunshine Cruz that trended nationwide and worldwide.

Filmography

Television

Films

References

1998 births
Living people
Filipino child singers
Filipino female models
Mariel
Mariel
21st-century Filipino singers
21st-century Filipino women singers